Sir John Dongan, 2nd Baronet (1603–1650) was a member of the Irish Parliament.

Early life
Dongan was born into an old Gaelic Norman (Irish Catholic) family in Castletown Kildrought (now Celbridge), County Kildare, in the Kingdom of Ireland. He was the son of Jane Rochfort and Walter Dongan (d. 1626), who was created 1st Dongan Baronet, of Castletown in the County of Kildare, in the Baronetage of Ireland in 1623.

His maternal grandparents were Robert Rochfort of Kilbryde, County Meath and Elinor Dillon (a daughter of Sir Lucas Dillon, Chief Baron of the Exchequer of Ireland).  His paternal grandparents were Margaret ( Forster) Dongan and John Dongan, originally of Fishamble Street, Dublin, a civil servant in the Irish Government who became wealthy and acquired substantial estates in County Kildare.

Career
Upon his father's death in 1626, he became the 2nd Baronet and took up residence at Castletown. He was a member of the Irish Parliament of 1634, under King Charles I of England. In 1643, he was a captain of horse.

Personal life
Dongan was married to Mary Talbot, one of eight sons and eight daughters of Sir William Talbot, 1st Baronet and the former Alison Netterville. Together, they were the parents of at least ten children, including:

 Sir Walter Dongan, 3rd Baronet (–1686), a Confederate Catholic who assembled at Kilkenny in 1646 and served under Richard Talbot, 1st Earl of Tyrconnell.
 William Dongan, 1st Earl of Limerick (–1698), the 4th Baronet who was made Viscount Dungan, of Clane in the County of Kildare in 1661 and Earl of Limerick in 1686, with remainder, failing male issue of his own, to his brothers Robert, Michael and Thomas and the heirs male of their bodies. 
 Thomas Dongan, 2nd Earl of Limerick (1634–1715), the Governor of New York from 1683 to 1688.
 Bridget Dongan (b. ), who married Francis Nugent, a son of Sir Thomas Nugent, 1st Baronet.
 Alice Dongan (b. ), who married Robert Nugent, son of Walter Nugent.
 Margaret Dongan (d. 1678), who married Robert Barnewell, 9th Baron Trimlestown.

Sir John died in 1650 but his will was not proved until 1663.

Descendants
Through his daughter Margaret, he was the grandfather of Mary Barnewell, who married her cousin, Michael Nugent, and were the parents of Robert Nugent, 1st Earl Nugent.

References
Notes

Sources

1603 births
1650 deaths
17th-century Irish people
Irish Roman Catholic Confederates
Baronets in the Baronetage of Ireland
Irish MPs 1634–1635
Politicians from County Kildare